OneJet is a defunct virtual airline that specialized in scheduled point-to-point flights operated by small business jets and regional aircraft. Flights were operated utilizing a public charter arrangement.

Unlike some other airlines operating small aircraft under a public charter arrangement, that operate from a private terminal or fixed-base operator facility, OneJet used the normal passenger terminals and gates of the airports to which it flew.

History
The airline was established in 2009 as PrimAir and rebranded OneJet in 2014. Its first route, weekday roundtrip flights from Indianapolis International Airport to General Mitchell International Airport in Milwaukee was announced on March 15, 2015, to begin April 6, 2015. Flights were operated by Pentastar Aviation using Hawker Beechjet 400A business jets fitted with seven-passenger seats. The airline stated that additional destinations from Indianapolis would be announced in April 2015. On April 24, 2015 the airline announced service from Indianapolis to Pittsburgh International Airport to begin May 11. Service between Milwaukee and Pittsburgh was also announced that same date, due to start May 4.

On April 6, 2016, OneJet announced that it would move its base of operations from Indianapolis to Pittsburgh and that Corporate Flight Management (CFM) would take over flight operations from Pentastar. In preparation for the move, all flights from Indianapolis to Milwaukee, Memphis, and Nashville were curtailed with only the flights from Pittsburgh running. The airline indicated that it would increase the frequency of its flights from Pittsburgh; and add destinations from the Pittsburgh focus city. After a short hiatus, CFM began OneJet operations on June 8, 2016 between Pittsburgh and Hartford, with flights to Indianapolis and Milwaukee commencing six days later. Since the transition to CFM as the operating carrier, flights between Pittsburgh and Indianapolis were briefly operated by IAI Westwind and Learjet 35 aircraft rather than the Beechjet 400A.

Milwaukee was announced as a second base of operations on October 3, 2017 with flights to Columbus and Omaha starting on November 1. Later that month, OneJet signed a deal with Textron Aviation for two eight-seat Cessna Citation CJ4 aircraft to be delivered in Q1 2018, with further deliveries planned. OneJet also had plans to use a larger 30-seat Embraer ERJ135 aircraft for their future Albany-Buffalo route. On May 1, 2018, OneJet announced it was acquiring Ultimate Jetcharters and Ultimate Air Shuttle which focus on semiprivate scheduled flights and corporate shuttles. However, on August 21, it was reported that the purchase of Ultimate had fallen through.

On August 29, 2018, OneJet suspended all service, reportedly temporarily. Ultimate Jetcharters, which was operating all OneJet flights at the time, announced that it was terminating the flights due to the collapse of the acquisition deal; OneJet, in turn, announced that it was pursuing its own air operator's certificate so it could operate its own flights. OneJet claimed that it would resume booking on October 1, 2018, but as of November 30th, it had not done so; it was unknown which routes would be carried over, and whether or not any previously terminated or suspended routes will be resumed. As of September 8, 2018, OneJet has been removed from Pittsburgh International Airport's route map, implying that they will not be returning. As of August 28, 2018, the airline has also been removed from Milwaukee General Mitchell International Airport's list of airlines page. Officials from GMIA have not been informed of any schedule terminations, but confirm that no OneJet flights have been flown into or out of Milwaukee since June. All of the OneJet aircraft have either been sold or transferred to the Contour Airlines public charter services. In November 2018, airport authorities in Albany, Buffalo, and Pittsburgh filed for an involuntary Chapter 7 bankruptcy proceeding against OneJet.

Operators
OneJet did not hold its own air operator's certificate when flight operations ended in August 2018. At various times, OneJet flights were operated by the following air charter companies:
Corporate Flight Management
Pentastar Aviation
Ultimate Jetcharters

Destinations
As of August 29, 2018 all OneJet routes have been suspended:

Former fleet

See also
Air transportation in the United States
List of defunct airlines of the United States
Contour Airlines
Corporate Flight Management
Ultimate Air Shuttle

References

External links

Defunct airlines of the United States
Airlines established in 2015
Airlines disestablished in 2018
Business class airlines
Defunct charter airlines